Upper Island Cove, Newfoundland and Labrador is a town (Incorporated on October 19, 1965) in Newfoundland and Labrador. It is located in Division 1, Newfoundland and Labrador census division. It is north east of Bay Roberts. The Way office was established in 1864. The population was 942 in 1940; 1,346 in 1951, 1,563 in 1956, and 1762 in 1966. , the population is 1,401.

History 
Upper Island Cove is a unique town both in its physical location and its culture. Built at the bottom of high cliffs, the town was once known as “The Walled City." A number of today's residents are descendants of these early fishermen from England and Ireland.

Demographics 

St. Peter's Church and School 
The Parish of Upper Island Cove is made up of three congregations. St. Peter's, Upper Island Cove; St. John the Evangelist, Bishop's Cove; and St. Andrew's, Bryant's Cove. The Parish dates to 1815 when construction began on the first church building at Upper Island Cove.

Today, Upper Island Cove is one of the largest Anglican Parishes in the Diocese serving over 850 families in the three communities. Each of the Church buildings is unique in architecture and is well maintained. The Parish is served by active Sunday Schools, a Vacation Bible School, J.A., C.L.B., Three A.C.W. Branches, an A.C.A.A., and various Adult Christian Education Programs.

St. Peter’s School celebrated its 50th Anniversary in 2011. It is a part of the Eastern School District, whose main offices are in St. John's. St. Peter's currently has an enrollment of 248 students and offers grades Kindergarten through Grade 9. The average class size is 22.5 students. The school serves the communities of Bishop’s Cove, Bryant’s Cove and Upper Island Cove. Approximately 91% of students are bussed to school on a daily basis. Although its name dates back to the time when there was a denominational school system in Newfoundland and Labrador, and schools were run by various churches, today it is a public school.

Notable people
Craig Sharpe, musician and contestant on season four of Canadian Idol
Jason Greeley, musician and contestant on season two of Canadian Idol
Robert Slaney, ice hockey centre
John Lundrigan, member of the Newfoundland and Labrador House of Assembly and House of Commons
Haig Young, member of the Newfoundland and Labrador House of Assembly

See also
 List of cities and towns in Newfoundland and Labrador

References

Populated coastal places in Canada
Towns in Newfoundland and Labrador